The Statesman (Politikós; Latin: Politicus), also known by its Latin title, Politicus, is a Socratic dialogue written by Plato.  The text depicts a conversation among Socrates, the mathematician Theodorus, another person named Socrates (referred to as "Socrates the Younger"), and an unnamed philosopher from Elea referred to as "the Stranger" (xénos). It is ostensibly an attempt to arrive at a definition of "statesman," as opposed to "sophist" or "philosopher" and is presented as following the action of the Sophist.

The Sophist had begun with the question of whether the sophist, statesman, and philosopher were one or three, leading the Eleatic Stranger to argue that they were three but that this could only be ascertained through full accounts of each (Sophist 217b).  But though Plato has his characters give accounts of the sophist and statesman in their respective dialogues, it is most likely that he never wrote a dialogue about the philosopher.

Contents 
The dialogue begins immediately after the Sophist ends, with Socrates (the elder) and Theodorus briefly reflecting on the discussion before the Eleatic Stranger proposes to begin a dialectical investigation with Socrates the Younger into the nature of the statesman.  The Eleatic Stranger and Socrates the Younger resume using the method of division employed in the Sophist, pausing to reflect on dialectical methods and a myth similar to the myth of ages.  The interlocutors ultimately offer a complicated account of the statesman through a version of division that entails accounting for the object of inquiry 'by carving at the joints' like a 'sacrificial animal' (Statesman 287b-c).

Interpretations 
According to John M. Cooper, the dialogue was intended to clarify that to rule or have political power called for a specialized knowledge. The statesman was one who possesses this special knowledge of how to rule justly and well and to have the best interests of the citizens at heart. It is presented that politics should be run by this knowledge, or gnosis. This claim runs counter to those who, the Stranger points out, actually did rule. Those that rule merely give the appearance of such knowledge, but in the end are really sophists or imitators.  For, as the Stranger maintains, a sophist is one who does not know the right thing to do, but only appears to others as someone who does. The Stranger's ideal of how one arrives at this knowledge of power is through social divisions. The Stranger takes great pains to be very specific about where and why the divisions are needed in order to rule the citizenry properly.

Texts and translations
Greek text at Perseus
Plato: Statesman, Philebus, Ion. Greek with translation by Harold N. Fowler and W. R. M. Lamb. Loeb Classical Library 164. Harvard Univ. Press (originally published 1925).  HUP listing
Fowler translation at Perseus
Jowett translation with introduction at StandardEbooks
Plato. Opera, volume I. Oxford Classical Texts. 
Plato. Complete Works. Ed. J. M. Cooper and D. S. Hutchinson. Hackett, 1997.

References

External links 

 

Dialogues of Plato
Political philosophy in ancient Greece